Davallia tasmanii is a fern in the family Davalliaceae found mainly in New Zealand (Three Kings Islands) and Tasmania. It grows well in dry place and the growth is very slow. It can grow from spores and rooted pieces.

References

 Allan, H.H, Flora of New Zealand. Vol. I., 1961 
 A classification for extant ferns, 2006

Davalliaceae
Ferns of Australia
Flora of Tasmania
Plants described in 1890